
A B C D E F G H I J K L M N O P Q R S T U V U W X Y Z

This is an incomplete list of species in the genus Entoloma. According to a standard reference book, the genus contains about 1000 species. Many species formerly classified in the genera Rhodocybe, Clitopilus, Richoniella, and Rhodogaster were formally transferred to Entoloma as a result of molecular analysis published in 2009.

A 

Entoloma abbreviatipes (Largent) Noordel. & Co-David
Entoloma aberrans E.Horak
Entoloma abnorme (Peck) Noordel.
 Entoloma abortivum (Berkeley & M.A.Curtis) Donk
Entoloma accline (Britzelm.) Sacc.
Entoloma accola (Britzelm.) Sacc.
Entoloma aciculocystis (Romagn. & Gilles) Noordel. & Co-David
Entoloma acidophilum Arnolds & Noordel.
Entoloma acuferum (Romagn. & Gilles) Noordel. & Co-David
Entoloma acidophilum Arnolds & Noordel.
Entoloma acuticystidiosum E.Horak
Entoloma acutipes Largent
Entoloma acutoconicum (Hongo) E.Horak
Entoloma acutopallidum E.Horak & Cheype
Entoloma acutoumbonatum (Largent) Noordel. & Co-David
Entoloma acutum (Romagn. & Gilles) Noordel. & Co-David
Entoloma adalbertii Romagn.
Entoloma adirondackense Murrill
Entoloma aeruginosum Hiroë
Entoloma aethiops (Scop.) G.Stev.
Entoloma afrum (Pegler) Noordel. & Co-David
Entoloma alabamense (Murrill) Hesler
Entoloma alachuanum Murrill
Entoloma albatum Hesler
Entoloma albellum (Romagn.) Singer
Entoloma albidiforme Murrill
Entoloma albidocoeruleum G.Gates & Noordel.
Entoloma albidoquadratum Manim. & Noordel.
Entoloma albidosimulans G.Gates & Noordel.
 Entoloma albidum Murrill
Entoloma albinellum (Peck) Hesler
Entoloma albipes
Entoloma albivellum (Romagn. & Gilles) Noordel. & Co-David
Entoloma alboconicum Dennis
Entoloma albocrenulatum E. Horak
Entoloma alboflavidum Rick
Entoloma albofumeum Hesler
Entoloma albogracile E.Horak
Entoloma albogranulosum Noordel. & Hauskn.
Entoloma albogriseum (Peck) Redhead
Entoloma albomagnum G.Gates & Noordel.
Entoloma albomurinum (Romagn. & Gilles) Noordel. & Co-David
Entoloma alboroseum (Romagn. & Gilles) Noordel. & Co-David
Entoloma albosericeum Hesler
Entoloma albosulcatum Corner & E.Horak
Entoloma albotomentosum Noordel. & Hauskn.
Entoloma alboumbonatum Hesler
Entoloma album Hiroë
Entoloma alcalinum Murrill
Entoloma alcedicolor Arnolds & Noordel.
Entoloma aliquantulum E.Horak
Entoloma alium Corner & E.Horak
Entoloma alliodorum Esteve-Rav., E.Horak & A.Ortega
Entoloma allochroum Noordel.
Entoloma allocybesimilis Manim. & Noordel.
Entoloma allosericellum Noordel.
Entoloma allospermum Noordel.
Entoloma alnetorum Monthoux & Röllin
Entoloma alnicola Noordel. & Polemis
Entoloma alnobetulae (Kühner) Noordel.
Entoloma alpicola (J.Favre) Noordel.
Entoloma altissimum (Massee) E.Horak
Entoloma alutaceum Murrill
Entoloma alutae E.Horak
Entoloma alvarense Noordel. & Vauras
Entoloma ambiguum (Romagn. & Gilles) Noordel. & Co-David
Entoloma ambrosium (Quél.) Noordel.
Entoloma ameides (Berk. & Broome) Quél.
Entoloma andersonii (Mazzer) Noordel. & Co-David
Entoloma angustisporum (Romagn. & Gilles) Noordel. & Co-David
Entoloma anisothrix (Romagn. & Gilles) Noordel. & Co-David
Entoloma applanatum (Romagn. & Gilles) Noordel. & Co-David
Entoloma approximatum (Largent) Noordel. & Co-David
Entoloma aprile (Britzelm.) Sacc.
Entoloma arcuatum (Romagn. & Gilles) Noordel. & Co-David
Entoloma argenteolanatum (T.J.Baroni, Perd.-Sánch. & S.A.Cantrell) Noordel. & Co-David
Entoloma aromaticum E.Horak
Entoloma asprellopsis G.Gates & Noordel.
Entoloma asprellum (Fr.) Fayod
Entoloma asterospermum (Romagn. & Gilles) Noordel. & Co-David
Entoloma asterosporum (Coker & Couch) Noordel. & Co-David
Entoloma atrifucatum (Largent) Noordel. & Co-David
Entoloma atrovelutinum (Romagn. & Gilles) Noordel. & Co-David
Entoloma atroviolaceum (Romagn.) Noordel. & Co-David
Entoloma atypicum (E.Horak) Noordel. & Co-David
Entoloma aurantioquadratum C.K.Pradeep & K.B.Vrinda
Entoloma aurantiolabes G.Gates & Noordel.
Entoloma austroprunicolor G.M.Gates & Noordel.
Entoloma austrorhodocalyx G.Gates & Noordel.
Entoloma austroroseum G.Gates & Noordel.
Entoloma avellanicolor (Romagn. & Gilles) Noordel. & Co-David
Entoloma avellaneosquamosum Hesler
Entoloma avellaneum Murrill
Entoloma avilanum (Dennis) E.Horak
Entoloma azureostipes E.Horak
Entoloma azureoviride E.Horak & Singer
Entoloma azureum (Largent) Noordel. & Co-David

B 
Entoloma badissimum (Largent) Noordel. & Co-David
Entoloma belouvense Noordel. & Hauskn.
Entoloma bicoloripes (Largent & Thiers) Noordel. & Co-David
Entoloma bisporiferum (Romagn. & Gilles) Noordel. & Co-David
Entoloma bituminosum (Romagn. & Gilles) Noordel. & Co-David
Entoloma bloxamii (Berk. & Broome) Sacc.
Entoloma borbonicum Noordel. & Hauskn.
Entoloma breivispermum G.Gates & Noordel.
Entoloma brunneolamellatum (Largent) Noordel. & Co-David
Entoloma brunneoloroseum (Romagn. & Gilles) Noordel. & Co-David

C 

Entoloma caeruleonigrum (Romagn. & Gilles) Noordel. & Co-David
Entoloma caesiolimbatum (Romagn. & Gilles) Noordel. & Co-David
Entoloma caesiomurinum (Romagn. & Gilles) Noordel. & Co-David
Entoloma caesiopileum (Romagn. & Gilles) Noordel. & Co-David
Entoloma callidermoides (Romagn. & Gilles) Noordel. & Co-David
Entoloma callidermum (Romagn.) Noordel. & Co-David
Entoloma callithrix (Romagn. & Gilles) Noordel. & Co-David
Entoloma calongei (E.Horak & G.Moreno) Noordel. & Co-David
Entoloma camarophyllus G.Gates & Noordel.
Entoloma campanulatum (Romagn.) Noordel. & Co-David
Entoloma candicans (Romagn. & Gilles) Noordel. & Co-David
Entoloma candidogranulosum Noordel. & Hauskn.
Entoloma capitatum (Romagn. & Gilles) Noordel. & Co-David
Entoloma capnoides (Romagn. & Gilles) Noordel. & Co-David
Entoloma carminicolor G.Gates & Noordel.
Entoloma celatum (Mazzer) Noordel. & Co-David
Entoloma cetratum  (Fr.) M.M.Moser
Entoloma changchunense Xiao Lan He & T.H.Li
Entoloma chilense (E.Horak) Noordel. & Co-David
Entoloma chloroconus (Romagn. & Gilles) Noordel. & Co-David
Entoloma chloroides (Romagn. & Gilles) Noordel. & Co-David
Entoloma chlorospilum (Romagn. & Gilles) Noordel. & Co-David
Entoloma choanomorphum G.Gates & Noordel.
Entoloma chrysopus G.Gates & Noordel.
Entoloma ciliferum (Romagn. & Gilles) Noordel. & Co-David
Entoloma cinereovirens (Romagn. & Gilles) Noordel. & Co-David
Entoloma clavipilum (Romagn. & Gilles) Noordel. & Co-David
Entoloma clypeatum (L.) P.Kumm.
Entoloma coactum (Largent) Noordel. & Co-David
Entoloma coeleste (Romagn. & Gilles) Noordel. & Co-David
Entoloma coelopus (Romagn. & Gilles) Noordel. & Co-David
Entoloma coeruleogracilis G.Gates & Noordel.
Entoloma coeruleomagnum G.Gates & Noordel.
Entoloma concavum (Largent) Noordel. & Co-David
Entoloma conferendum (Britz.) Noordel.
Entoloma contortisporum Noordel. & Hauskn.
Entoloma contrastans G.Gates & Noordel.
Entoloma convexum G.Stev.
Entoloma coprinoides (Romagn.) Noordel. & Co-David
Entoloma crassicystidiatum T.H.Li & Xiao Lan He
Entoloma crassum C.K.Pradeep & K.B.Vrinda
Entoloma cremeoluteum (Largent) Noordel. & Co-David
Entoloma crenulatum (Largent) Noordel. & Co-David
Entoloma cretaceum G.Gates & Noordel.
Entoloma crinitum E.Horak
Entoloma cristalliferum (Romagn. & Gilles) Noordel. & Co-David
Entoloma cupressum (Largent) Noordel. & Co-David
Entoloma curtissimum (Romagn. & Gilles) Noordel. & Co-David
Entoloma cyananthes (Romagn.) Noordel. & Co-David
Entoloma cyanocalix (Romagn. & Gilles) Noordel. & Co-David
Entoloma cyanoides (Romagn.) Noordel. & Co-David
Entoloma cyathus (Romagn. & Gilles) Noordel. & Co-David
Entoloma cylindrocapitatum (T.J.Baroni & Ovrebo) Noordel. & Co-David
Entoloma cystidioliferum (Romagn. & Gilles) Noordel. & Co-David
Entoloma cystidiosum G.Gates & Noordel.
Entoloma cystomarginatum (Largent) Noordel. & Co-David

D 

Entoloma davidii Noordel. & Co-David
Entoloma debile (Corner & E.Horak) Noordel. & Co-David
Entoloma decastes Contu, Cons. & Noordel.
Entoloma deconicoides (Romagn. & Gilles) Noordel. & Co-David
Entoloma decurrentius (Romagn. & Gilles) Noordel. & Co-David
Entoloma deformisporum (Romagn. & Gilles) Noordel. & Co-David
Entoloma denticulatum (Romagn. & Gilles) Noordel. & Co-David
Entoloma dichrooides (Romagn. & Gilles) Noordel. & Co-David
Entoloma dichroum (Pers.) P. Kumm.
Entoloma dicubospermum (Romagn. & Gilles) Noordel. & Co-David
Entoloma dimorphocystis (Romagn. & Gilles) Noordel. & Co-David
Entoloma dinghuense T.H.Li & Chuan H.Li
Entoloma discoloratum Largent – Australia
Entoloma diversum (Largent) Noordel. & Co-David
Entoloma dochmiopus (Romagn. & Gilles) Noordel. & Co-David
Entoloma domingense (T.J. Baroni) Noordel. & Co-David
Entoloma dryophiloides (Romagn. & Gilles) Noordel. & Co-David
Entoloma dubium (Romagn. & Gilles) Noordel. & Co-David
Entoloma dulcisaporum (Largent) Noordel. & Co-David
Entoloma dysthaloides Noordel.

E 
Entoloma ealaense (Beeli) Noordel. & Co-David
Entoloma eburneum (Romagn. & Gilles) Noordel. & Co-David
Entoloma effugiens (Romagn. & Gilles) Noordel. & Co-David
Entoloma elaeidis (Romagn. & Gilles) Noordel. & Co-David
Entoloma elegans (Romagn. & Gilles) Noordel. & Co-David
Entoloma elongatum (Romagn.) Noordel. & Co-David
Entoloma euchloroides (Romagn. & Gilles) Noordel. & Co-David
Entoloma eudermum (Romagn. & Gilles) Noordel. & Co-David
Entoloma eugenei Noordel. & O.V. Morozova
Entoloma euteles (Romagn. & Gilles) Noordel. & Co-David
Entoloma exalbidum (Largent) Noordel. & Co-David

F 

Entoloma fabaceolum (Largent) Noordel. & Co-David
Entoloma fastigiatum (Largent) Noordel. & Co-David
Entoloma ferreri (T.J. Baroni, Perd.-Sánch. & S.A. Cantrell) Noordel. & Co-David
Entoloma fibrillosipes (Murrill) Noordel. & Co-David
Entoloma fibrosopileatum G.Gates & Noordel.
Entoloma fibulatum (Romagn.) Noordel. & Co-David
Entoloma flavostipitatum Pradeep & Vrinda & Bijeesh & Baroni
Entoloma flavoviride Peck
Entoloma flexuosipes (Romagn. & Gilles) Noordel. & Co-David
Entoloma foliocontusum (Largent) Noordel. & Co-David
Entoloma fructufragrans (Largent & Thiers) Noordel. & Co-David
Entoloma fuligineopallescens G.Gates & Noordel.
Entoloma fuligineoviolaceum G.Gates & Noordel.
Entoloma fulviceps (Romagn.) Noordel. & Co-David
Entoloma fumosopruinosum G.Gates & Noordel.
Entoloma furfuraceidiscus (Largent) Noordel. & Co-David
Entoloma furfuraceum T.H.Li & Xiao Lan He
Entoloma fuscatum (Largent) Noordel. & Co-David
Entoloma fusciceps (Kauffman) Noordel. & Co-David
Entoloma fuscoocellatum (Romagn. & Gilles) Noordel. & Co-David
Entoloma fuscoortonii (Largent) Noordel. & Co-David
Entoloma fusicystis (Romagn. & Gilles) Noordel. & Co-David
Entoloma fusiferum (Romagn. & Gilles) Noordel. & Co-David

G 

Entoloma gabonicum (Romagn. & Gilles) Noordel. & Co-David
Entoloma galeroides (Romagn. & Gilles) Noordel. & Co-David
Entoloma gasteromycetoides Co-David & Noordel.
Entoloma gelatinosum E.Horak
Entoloma geminum (Romagn.) Noordel. & Co-David
Entoloma gibbosporum Noordel. & Hauskn.
Entoloma gigaspermum (Romagn. & Gilles) Noordel. & Co-David
Entoloma gilvum (Romagn. & Gilles) Noordel. & Co-David
Entoloma glaucogilvum (Romagn. & Gilles) Noordel. & Co-David
Entoloma glutiniceps (Hongo) Noordel. & Co-David
Entoloma grammatum (Romagn. & Gilles) Noordel. & Co-David
Entoloma granulatum (Romagn.) Noordel. & Co-David
Entoloma griseipes (Romagn. & Gilles) Noordel. & Co-David
Entoloma griseocyaneum (Fr.) P.Kumm.
Entoloma griseoroseum (Romagn. & Gilles) Noordel. & Co-David
Entoloma griseosquamulosum G.Gates & Noordel.
Entoloma griseovioleum (Romagn. & Gilles) Noordel. & Co-David
Entoloma guttulatum Largent – Australia

H 

Entoloma haastii G.Stev
Entoloma haematinum Manim., Leelav. & Noordel.
Entoloma hallstromii E. Horak
Entoloma hausknechtii Noordel. 2004
Entoloma hebes (Romagn.) Trimbach
Entoloma heimii (Romagn.) Eyssart., Buyck & Courtec.
Entoloma helictum (Berk.) Hesler
Entoloma hirtellum (Romagn.) Noordel. & Co-David
Entoloma hochstetteri (Reichardt) G.Stev.
Entoloma holocyaneum (Romagn.) Noordel. & Co-David
Entoloma holoconiotum (Largent & Thiers) Noordel. & Co-David
Entoloma horridum (E.Horak) Noordel. & Co-David
Entoloma hoyafragrans Noordel. & Hauskn.
Entoloma humicola (Romagn. & Gilles) Noordel. & Co-David
Entoloma hymenidermum Largent – Australia
Entoloma hypochlorum (Romagn. & Gilles) Noordel. & Co-David
Entoloma hypoglaucum (Romagn.) Noordel. & Co-David

I 

Entoloma ianthomelas (Romagn. & Gilles) Noordel. & Co-David
Entoloma incanosquamulosum (Largent) Noordel. & Co-David
Entoloma incanum (Fr.) Hesler
Entoloma incurvum (Romagn. & Gilles) Noordel. & Co-David
Entoloma indigoticoumbrinum G.Gates & Noordel.
Entoloma infundibulare (Romagn.) Noordel. & Co-David
Entoloma inocybospermum (Romagn. & Gilles) Noordel. & Co-David
Entoloma inodes (Romagn. & Gilles) Noordel. & Co-David
Entoloma insuetum (Largent) Noordel. & Co-David
Entoloma intervenosum (Romagn. & Gilles) Noordel. & Co-David
Entoloma invisibile (Romagn. & Gilles) Noordel. & Co-David
Entoloma ionocyanum (Romagn. & Gilles) Noordel. & Co-David
Entoloma irinum (Romagn. & Gilles) Noordel. & Co-David

K 
Entoloma kansaiense (Hongo) Noordel. & Co-David
Entoloma kermandii G.Gates & Noordel.
Entoloma kewarra Largent – Australia

L 

Entoloma lamellirugum (Romagn. & Gilles) Noordel. & Co-David
Entoloma lasium (Berk. & Broome) Noordel. & Co-David
Entoloma lateripes (Romagn. & Gilles) Noordel. & Co-David
Entoloma lateritium (Romagn. & Gilles) Noordel. & Co-David
Entoloma latisporum (Romagn. & Gilles) Noordel. & Co-David
Entoloma lecythiocystis (Romagn. & Gilles) Noordel. & Co-David
Entoloma lecythiophorum (Romagn. & Gilles) Noordel. & Co-David
Entoloma lepiotoides G.Gates & Noordel.
Entoloma leptohyphes (Romagn.) Noordel. & Co-David
Entoloma leptoniisporum (Costantin & L.M. Dufour) Noordel. & Co-David
Entoloma leucocephalum (Romagn. & Gilles) Noordel. & Co-David
Entoloma leucopus (Romagn. & Gilles) Noordel. & Co-David
Entoloma lisalense (Beeli) Noordel. & Co-David
Entoloma lividoalbum (Kühner & Romagn.) Kubicka
Entoloma lomavrithum K.N. Anil Raj & Manim.
Entoloma longissimum (Romagn. & Gilles) Noordel. & Co-David
Entoloma lutense (Romagn. & Gilles) Noordel. & Co-David
Entoloma luteum Peck
Entoloma lutulentum (Largent) Noordel. & Co-David

M 

Entoloma macrosporum (J.W. Cribb) Noordel. & Co-David
Entoloma maheense Noordel. & Hauskn.
Entoloma mammiferum (Romagn.) Noordel. & Co-David
Entoloma manganense G.Gates & Noordel.
Entoloma margaritiferum (Romagn. & Gilles) Noordel. & Co-David
Entoloma mascarense Noordel. & Hauskn.
Entoloma mastoideum T.H.Li & Xiao Lan He
Entoloma mathinnae G.M.Gates, B.M.Horton & Noordel.
Entoloma mauritianum Noordel. & Hauskn.
Entoloma mediofuscum (Romagn. & Gilles) Noordel. & Co-David
Entoloma megalothrix (Romagn. & Gilles) Noordel. & Co-David
Entoloma melanophthalmum G.Gates & Noordel.
Entoloma membranaceum (Pegler) Noordel. & Co-David
Entoloma microcystis (Romagn. & Gilles) Noordel. & Co-David
Entoloma minutopilum (Largent) Noordel. & Co-David
Entoloma minutostriatum (Largent) Noordel. & Co-David
Entoloma miraculosum (E.Horak) Noordel. & Co-David
Entoloma modestissimum (Romagn. & Gilles) Noordel. & Co-David
Entoloma modicum (Romagn. & Gilles) Noordel. & Co-David
Entoloma mondahense (Romagn. & Gilles) Noordel. & Co-David
Entoloma moongum Grgur.
Entoloma moserianum Noordel.
Entoloma muscorum Cleland
Entoloma mutabilipes Noordel. & Liiv
Entoloma myceliosum E. Horak
Entoloma myceniforme (Murrill) Hesler
Entoloma mycenoides (Hongo) Hongo
Entoloma myochroum Noordel. & E. Ludw.
 Entoloma murrayi (Berk. & M.A.Curtis) Sacc.
Entoloma myrmecophilum (Romagn.) M.M. Moser

N 

Entoloma natalis-domini G.Gates & Noordel.
Entoloma natarajanii Senthilarasu, Kumaresan & S.K.Singh
Entoloma neosericellum E.Horak
Entoloma neoturbidum Pegler
Entoloma nidorosiforme (Romagn.) Noordel. & Co-David
Entoloma nigrellum (Pers.) Noordel.
Entoloma nigrodiscum Hesler
Entoloma nirupamum Manim., A.V.Joseph & Leelav.
Entoloma nitidum Quél.
Entoloma nivescens Noordel.
Entoloma niveum G.Stev.
Entoloma nodosporum (G.F.Atk.) Noordel.
Entoloma noordeloosi Hauskn.
Entoloma nothofagi G.Stev.
Entoloma novum E.Horak
Entoloma nubigenum (Singer) Garrido
Entoloma nubilum Manim., Leelav. & Noordel.
Entoloma nudipileum (Romagn. & Gilles) Noordel. & Co-David
Entoloma nudum (Romagn. & Gilles) Noordel. & Co-David

O 
Entoloma obnubile (Romagn. & Gilles) Noordel. & Co-David
Entoloma obscuratum (Largent) Noordel. & Co-David
Entoloma obscureotenax G.Gates & Noordel.
Entoloma obscureovirens G.Gates & Noordel.
Entoloma obscuromarginatum (Romagn. & Gilles) Noordel. & Co-David
Entoloma ocellatum (Romagn. & Gilles) Noordel. & Co-David
Entoloma oncocystis (Romagn. & Gilles) Noordel. & Co-David
Entoloma ovatosporum (Largent) Noordel. & Co-David

P 

Entoloma pallidius (Romagn. & Gilles) Noordel. & Co-David
Entoloma pallideviolaceum Noordel. & Hauskn.
Entoloma pallidissimum (Romagn. & Gilles) Noordel. & Co-David
Entoloma pallidocarneum (Romagn. & Gilles) Noordel. & Co-David
Entoloma pallidosporum (Romagn. & Gilles) Noordel. & Co-David
Entoloma pamelae Largent – Australia
Entoloma pandanicola (E.Horak) Noordel. & Co-David
Entoloma panniculus (Berk.) Sacc.
Entoloma pardinum (Romagn.) Noordel. & Co-David
Entoloma pasasericeum E.Horak
Entoloma paucifolium (Romagn. & Gilles) Noordel. & Co-David
Entoloma perbloxamii Noordel, D.L.V. Co, G. Gates and Morgado
Entoloma percrinitum G.Gates & Noordel.
Entoloma perflavifolium Noordel. & Co-David
Entoloma perfuscum (Largent) Noordel. & Co-David
Entoloma phaeomarginatum E.Horak
Entoloma phaeoxanthum (Romagn. & Gilles) Noordel. & Co-David
Entoloma phaeum (Romagn. & Gilles) Noordel. & Co-David
Entoloma pigmentosipes (Largent) Noordel. & Co-David
Entoloma pilosellum (Romagn. & Gilles) Noordel. & Co-David
Entoloma planoconvexum (Romagn. & Gilles) Noordel. & Co-David
Entoloma platyspermum (Romagn. & Gilles) Noordel. & Co-David
Entoloma pluricolor (Romagn. & Gilles) Noordel. & Co-David
Entoloma poliothrix (Romagn. & Gilles) Noordel. & Co-David
Entoloma politum (Pers.) Donk
Entoloma polyphyllum (Romagn. & Gilles) Noordel. & Co-David
Entoloma porphyrescens E.Horak
Entoloma praegracile Xiao Lan He & T.H.Li
Entoloma procerum G.Stev.
Entoloma propinquum Noordel. & Co-David
Entoloma pseudobulbipes (Largent) Noordel. & Co-David
Entoloma pseudocystidiatum (Romagn. & Gilles) Noordel. & Co-David
Entoloma pseudodenticulatum (Romagn. & Gilles) Noordel. & Co-David
Entoloma pseudodochmiopus (Romagn. & Gilles) Noordel. & Co-David
Entoloma pseudoheimii Eyssart., Buyck & Courtec.
Entoloma pseudohirtipes (Largent) Noordel. & Co-David
Entoloma pseudorrhombosporum (Romagn. & Gilles) Noordel. & Co-David
Entoloma pseudostrictium (Largent) Noordel. & Co-David
Entoloma pseudotruncatum (Romagn. & Gilles) Noordel. & Co-David
Entoloma psilocyboides G.Gates & Noordel.
Entoloma pudicum (Romagn. & Gilles) Noordel. & Co-David
Entoloma pulcherrimum (Romagn.) Noordel. & Co-David
Entoloma pulveripes (Romagn. & Gilles) Noordel. & Co-David
Entoloma punctipileum (Romagn. & Gilles) Noordel. & Co-David
Entoloma punctulatum (Romagn.) Noordel. & Co-David
Entoloma pusillipapillatum (Largent) Noordel. & Co-David

Q 
Entoloma quadratum (Berk. & M. A. Curtis) E. Horak
Entoloma quadrosporum (Largent & O.K.Mill.) Noordel. & Co-David
Entoloma quercophilum (Largent) Noordel. & Co-David

R 

Entoloma reaae (Maire) Noordel.
Entoloma readiae G.Stev.
Entoloma reae (Maire) Noordel.
Entoloma rectangulum (Largent) Noordel. & Co-David
Entoloma reinwaldii Noordel. & Hauskn.
Entoloma remotum (Romagn. & Gilles) Noordel. & Co-David
Entoloma reunionense Noordel. & Hauskn.
Entoloma rigidipus (Largent) Noordel. & Co-David
Entoloma rhodanthes (Romagn.) Noordel. & Co-David
Entoloma rhodellum (Romagn.) Noordel. & Co-David
 Entoloma rhodopolium (Fr.) P.Kumm.
Entoloma rigens (Romagn. & Gilles) Noordel. & Co-David
Entoloma rodwayi (Massee) E.Horak
Entoloma roseicinnamomeum (Largent) Noordel. & Co-David
Entoloma roseoluteolum G.Gates & Noordel.
Entoloma roseomurinum (Romagn. & Gilles) Noordel. & Co-David
Entoloma roseotransparens Noordel. & Hauskn.
Entoloma rostratum (Largent) Noordel. & Co-David
Entoloma rotula (Romagn.) Noordel. & Co-David
Entoloma rufobasis G.Gates & Noordel.
Entoloma rufocarneum (Berk.) Noordel.
Entoloma rufovinascens Eyssart., Buyck & Courtec.
Entoloma rufum (Romagn. & Gilles) Noordel. & Co-David
Entoloma rugiferum (Romagn. & Gilles) Noordel. & Co-David
Entoloma rugosiviscosum Largent – Australia

S 

Entoloma sabulosum (Romagn. & Gilles) Noordel. & Co-David
Entoloma saepium (Noulet & Dass.) Richon & Roze
Entoloma salmoneum (Peck) Sacc.
Entoloma saponicum G.Gates & Noordel.
Entoloma sarcopum Nagasawa & Hongo.
Entoloma sassafras G.Gates & Noordel.
Entoloma saundersii (Fr.) Sacc.
Entoloma sclerobasidiatum (Romagn. & Gilles) Noordel. & Co-David
Entoloma scabrulosum (Largent) Noordel. & Co-David
Entoloma separatum (Largent) Noordel. & Co-David
Entoloma sepiaceovelutinum G.Gates & Noordel.
Entoloma sericellum (Fr.) P.Kumm.
Entoloma sericeum Quél.
Entoloma simplex (Romagn.) Noordel. & Co-David
 Entoloma sinuatum (Bull.) P.Kumm.
Entoloma sordidulum (Kühner & Romagn.) P.D.Orton
Entoloma speciosum (Romagn.) Putzke & M. Putzke
Entoloma spermaticum (Romagn. & Gilles) Noordel. & Co-David
Entoloma spurium (Romagn. & Gilles) Noordel. & Co-David
Entoloma stellatum G.Gates & Noordel.
Entoloma stramineopallescens G.Gates & Noordel.
Entoloma strictius (Peck) Sacc.
Entoloma strigosum G.Gates & Noordel.
Entoloma stylobates (Romagn. & Gilles) Noordel. & Co-David
Entoloma stylophorum (Berk. & Broome) Sacc.
Entoloma suaveolens C.K.Pradeep & K.B.Vrinda
Entoloma subalbidulum (Romagn. & Gilles) Noordel. & Co-David
Entoloma subaltissimum T.H.Li & Chuan H.Li
Entoloma subaraneosum Xiao Lan He & T.H.Li
Entoloma subbulbosum (Romagn. & Gilles) Noordel. & Co-David
Entoloma subcapitatum (Largent) Noordel. & Co-David
Entoloma subfusiferum (Romagn. & Gilles) Noordel. & Co-David
Entoloma subglabrum (Romagn.) Noordel. & Co-David
Entoloma subgracile (Largent) Noordel. & Co-David
Entoloma sublatifolium (Romagn. & Gilles) Noordel. & Co-David
Entoloma subnigrellum (Romagn.) Noordel. & Co-David
Entoloma subrhombospermum (Romagn. & Gilles) Noordel. & Co-David
Entoloma subrubineum (Largent & B.L. Thomps.) Noordel. & Co-David
Entoloma subroseum (T.J. Baroni & Lodge) Noordel. & Co-David
Entoloma subsericeoides (Largent) Noordel. & Co-David
Entoloma subsolstitiale (Largent) Noordel. & Co-David
Entoloma subsquamosum (Romagn.) Noordel. & Co-David
Entoloma subtile E.Horak
Entoloma subtenuipes Murrill
Entoloma subtruncatum Peck
Entoloma subumbilicatum Hesler
Entoloma subviduense (Largent) Noordel. & Co-David
Entoloma subvile (Peck) Hesler
Entoloma subviolaceovernum (Largent) Noordel. & Co-David
Entoloma sulcatum (T.J. Baroni & Lodge) Noordel. & Co-David
Entoloma sulphureum E.Horak
Entoloma svalbardense Noordel.

T 
Entoloma tabacinum (Cleland) E.Horak 1980
Entoloma taedium E.Horak 1978
Entoloma talisporum Corner & E.Horak 1976
Entoloma tasmanicum Noordel. & G.M.Gates 2012
Entoloma tectonicola Manim. & Noordel. 2006
Entoloma tectum E.Horak 2008
Entoloma tembelingii Corner & E.Horak 1980
Entoloma tenacipes Corner & E.Horak 1980 
Entoloma tenebricosum E.Horak 1978
Entoloma tenebricum  E.Ludw. 2007
Entoloma tenebrosum (Romagn. & Gilles) Noordel. & Co-David 2009
Entoloma tenellum  (J.Favre) Noordel. 1979 
Entoloma tengii W.M.Zhang & T.H.Li 2002
Entoloma tenuiculum Corner & E.Horak 1980
Entoloma tenuicystidiatum G.Gates & Noordel. 2009
Entoloma tenuipes  Murrill 1917
Entoloma tenuipileum (Romagn. & Gilles) Noordel. & Co-David 2009
Entoloma tephreum Hesler 1967
Entoloma termitophilum E.Horak 1980
Entoloma terreum Esteve-Rav. & Noordel. 2004
Entoloma testaceostrigosum Manim. & Noordel. 2006
Entoloma testaceum (Bres.) Noordel. 1987
Entoloma theekshnagandhum Manim., A.V.Joseph & Leelav. 1995
Entoloma thiersii (Largent) Noordel. & Co-David 2009
Entoloma tibiicystidiatum Arnolds & Noordel. 1979
Entoloma tigrinellum (Romagn.) Noordel. & Co-David 2009
Entoloma titthiophorum (Romagn. & Gilles) Noordel. & Co-David 2009
Entoloma tjallingiorum Noordel. 1982
Entoloma tomentosolilacinum G.Gates & Noordel. 2009
Entoloma tomentosum Z.S.Bi 1986
Entoloma tortile (Romagn.) Noordel. & Co-David 2009
Entoloma tortiliforme  Hampe, J.Kleine & Wölfel 2012
Entoloma tortipes Murrill 1917
Entoloma tortuosum Hesler 1967
Entoloma totialbum G.Gates & Noordel. 2009
Entoloma totivillosum Corner & E.Horak 1980
Entoloma transformatum (Peck) Noordel. 2008
Entoloma translucidum E.Horak 1973
Entoloma transitum (E.Horak) Noordel. & Co-David 2009
Entoloma transvenosum Noordel. 1982
Entoloma transmutans G.Gates & Noordel. 2009
Entoloma trichomarginatum Llorens van Wav. & Llistos. 2010
Entoloma trichomatum (Largent) Noordel. & Co-David 2009
Entoloma tricolor (Massee) E.Horak 1980
Entoloma trinitense Dennis 1953
Entoloma triste (Velen.) Noordel. 1979
Entoloma tristificum E.Horak 1973
Entoloma tristissimum (Romagn. & Gilles) Noordel. & Co-David 2009
Entoloma triviale (Kauffman) Largent 1971
Entoloma truncatum (Romagn.) Noordel. & Co-David 2009
Entoloma turbidiforme (Romagn. & Gilles) Noordel. & Co-David 2009
Entoloma turci (Bres.) M.M.Moser 1978

U 

Entoloma ulinginicola E.Horak
Entoloma umbilicatum Dennis
Entoloma umbiliciforme Hesler
Entoloma umbraphilum Noordel. & Hauskn.
Entoloma umbrinellum (S. Imai) Noordel. & Co-David
Entoloma umbrosum (Romagn. & Gilles) Noordel. & Co-David
Entoloma undatum (Gillet) M.M. Moser
Entoloma underwoodii Dennis
Entoloma undulatellum (Peck) Noordel.
Entoloma undulatosporum Arnolds & Noordel.
Entoloma unicolor (Peck) Hesler
Entoloma uranochroum Hauskn. & Noordel.
Entoloma ursulae Noordel., Wölfel & Hauskn.

V 

Entoloma variesporum (Romagn. & Gilles) Noordel. & Co-David
Entoloma velutipileum (Romagn. & Gilles) Noordel. & Co-David
Entoloma vernum S.Lundell
Entoloma vestipes (Romagn. & Gilles) Noordel. & Co-David
Entoloma vetulum (Romagn.) Noordel. & Co-David
Entoloma vinosulum (Romagn. & Gilles) Noordel. & Co-David
Entoloma vinaceobrunneum Hesler
Entoloma vinaceum (Scop.) Arnolds & Noordel.
Entoloma vindobonense Noordel. & Hauskn.
Entoloma violaceonigrum (Largent) Noordel. & Co-David
Entoloma violaceostriatum Noordel. & Hauskn.
Entoloma violaceotinctum Largent – Australia
Entoloma violascens G.Gates & Noordel.
Entoloma virescens (Berk. & M.A. Curtis) E. Horak ex Courtec.
Entoloma viridiflavipes (Largent) Noordel. & Co-David
Entoloma viridiphyllum Hesler
Entoloma viridomarginatum (Cleland) E.Horak
Entoloma viscaurantium E. Horak & Singer
Entoloma vitellinum (Singer) E. Horak
Entoloma vittalii Senthil., Kumaresan & S.K.Singh
Entoloma vulgare Hesler
Entoloma vulsum E.Horak

X 
Entoloma xanthocaulon Arnolds & Noordel.
Entoloma xanthochroum (P.D.Orton) Noordel.
Entoloma xanthocnemis (Romagn. & Gilles) Noordel. & Co-David
Entoloma xanthophaeum (Romagn. & Gilles) Noordel. & Co-David

Y 
Entoloma yunnanense J.Z.Ying

Z 
Entoloma zanthophyllum (Largent) Noordel. & Co-David
Entoloma zonatum Hesler
Entoloma zuccherellii (Noordel. & Hauskn.) Co-David & Noordel.

References

Entolomataceae
Entoloma species, List of